The 1957 Coupe de France Final was a football match held at Stade Olympique Yves-du-Manoir, Colombes on May 26, 1957, that saw Toulouse defeat Angers 6–3 thanks to goals by René Dereuddre (2), Abdelhamid Bouchouk, Robert Bocchi, Eduardo Di Loreto and Said Brahimi. The referee of the match was Jack Clough, it is still the only time the final's referee was not French.

Match details

See also
Coupe de France 1956-1957

External links
Coupe de France results at Rec.Sport.Soccer Statistics Foundation
Report on French federation site

Coupe
1957
Coupe De France Final 1957
Coupe De France Final 1957
Sport in Hauts-de-Seine
May 1957 sports events in Europe
1957 in Paris